The Three of Us (Italian: Noi tre) is an Italian comedy film directed by Pupi Avati. It entered the 41° Venice Film Festival, in which it won a special Lion for technical values.

Cast 
Cristopher Davidson as Wolfgang "Amadè" Mozart
Lino Capolicchio as Leopold Mozart
Gianni Cavina as The cousin
Carlo Schincaglia as The butler
Carlo Delle Piane as Count Pallavicini
Ida Di Benedetto as Maria Caterina Pallavicini
 as Giuseppe Pallavicini
Nik Novecento as Nicola
Guido Pizzirani as Padre Martini

References

External links

1984 films
1980s coming-of-age comedy films
Films directed by Pupi Avati
Films about Wolfgang Amadeus Mozart
Italian coming-of-age comedy films
Films set in the 1770s
Films scored by Riz Ortolani
1984 comedy films
1980s Italian films